A triangular number or triangle number counts objects arranged in an equilateral triangle. Triangular numbers are a type of figurate number, other examples being square numbers and cube numbers. The sequence of triangular numbers, starting with the 0th triangular number, is

(This sequence is included in the On-Line Encyclopedia of Integer Sequences .)

Formula

The triangular numbers are given by the following explicit formulas:

where  is a binomial coefficient. It represents the number of distinct pairs that can be selected from  objects, and it is read aloud as " plus one choose two".

The first equation can be illustrated using a visual proof. For every triangular number , imagine a "half-square" arrangement of objects corresponding to the triangular number, as in the figure below.  Copying this arrangement and rotating it to create a rectangular figure doubles the number of objects, producing a rectangle with dimensions , which is also the number of objects in the rectangle.  Clearly, the triangular number itself is always exactly half of the number of objects in such a figure, or: .  The example  follows:

This formula can be proven formally using mathematical induction. It is clearly true for :

Now assume that, for some natural number , . Adding  to this yields

The German mathematician and scientist, Carl Friedrich Gauss, is said to have found this relationship in his early youth, by multiplying  pairs of numbers in the sum by the values of each pair . However, regardless of the truth of this story, Gauss was not the first to discover this formula, and some find it likely that its origin goes back to the Pythagoreans in the 5th century BC. The two formulas were described by the Irish monk Dicuil in about 816 in his Computus. An English translation of Dicuil's account is available.

The triangular number  solves the handshake problem of counting the number of handshakes if each person in a room with  people shakes hands once with each person. The function  is the additive analog of the factorial function, which is the products of integers from 1 to .

The number of line segments between closest pairs of dots in the triangle can be represented in terms of the number of dots or with a recurrence relation:

In the limit, the ratio between the two numbers, dots and line segments is

Relations to other figurate numbers
Triangular numbers have a wide variety of relations to other figurate numbers.

Most simply, the sum of two consecutive triangular numbers is a square number, with the sum being the square of the difference between the two (and thus the difference of the two being the square root of the sum). Algebraically,

This fact can be demonstrated graphically by positioning the triangles in opposite directions to create a square:

The double of a triangular number, as in the visual proof from the above section , is called a pronic number.

There are infinitely many triangular numbers that are also square numbers; e.g., 1, 36, 1225. Some of them can be generated by a simple recursive formula:
 with 

All square triangular numbers are found from the recursion

This can also be expressed as

The sum of the first  triangular numbers is the th tetrahedral number:

More generally, the difference between the th -gonal number and the th -gonal number is the th triangular number. For example, the sixth heptagonal number (81) minus the sixth hexagonal number (66) equals the fifth triangular number, 15. Every other triangular number is a hexagonal number. Knowing the triangular numbers, one can reckon any centered polygonal number; the th centered -gonal number is obtained by the formula

where  is a triangular number.

The positive difference of two triangular numbers is a trapezoidal number.

The pattern found for triangular numbers  and for tetrahedral numbers  which uses binomial coefficients, can be generalized. This leads to the formula:

Other properties
Triangular numbers correspond to the first-degree case of Faulhaber's formula.

Alternating triangular numbers (1, 6, 15, 28, ...) are also hexagonal numbers.

Every even perfect number is triangular (as well as hexagonal), given by the formula

where  is a Mersenne prime. No odd perfect numbers are known; hence, all known perfect numbers are triangular.

For example, the third triangular number is (3 × 2 =) 6, the seventh is (7 × 4 =) 28, the 31st is (31 × 16 =) 496, and the 127th is (127 × 64 =) 8128.

The final digit of a triangular number is 0, 1, 3, 5, 6, or 8, and thus never end in 2, 4, 7, or 9. A final 3 must be preceded by a 0 or 5; a final 8 must be preceded by a 2 or 7.

In base 10, the digital root of a nonzero triangular number is always 1, 3, 6, or 9. Hence, every triangular number is either divisible by three or has a remainder of 1 when divided by 9:

There is a more specific property to the triangular numbers that aren't divisible by 3; that is, they either have a remainder 1 or 10 when divided by 27.  Those that are equal to 10 mod 27 are also equal to 10 mod 81.

The digital root pattern for triangular numbers, repeating every nine terms, as shown above, is "1, 3, 6, 1, 6, 3, 1, 9, 9".

The converse of the statement above is, however, not always true. For example, the digital root of 12, which is not a triangular number, is 3 and divisible by three.

Note that
 will always be a triangular number, because , which yields all the odd squares are revealed by multiplying a triangular number by 8 and adding 1, and the process for  given  is an odd square is the inverse of this operation.

The sum of the reciprocals of all the nonzero triangular numbers is

This can be shown by using the basic sum of a telescoping series:

Two other formulas regarding triangular numbers are

and

both of which can easily be established either by looking at dot patterns (see above) or with some simple algebra.

In 1796, Gauss discovered that every positive integer is representable as a sum of three triangular numbers (possibly including  = 0), writing in his diary his famous words, "ΕΥΡΗΚΑ! ". This theorem does not imply that the triangular numbers are different (as in the case of 20 = 10 + 10 + 0), nor that a solution with exactly three nonzero triangular numbers must exist. This is a special case of the Fermat polygonal number theorem.

The largest triangular number of the form  is 4095 (see Ramanujan–Nagell equation).

Wacław Franciszek Sierpiński posed the question as to the existence of four distinct triangular numbers in geometric progression. It was conjectured by Polish mathematician Kazimierz Szymiczek to be impossible and was later proven by Fang and Chen in 2007.

Formulas involving expressing an integer as the sum of triangular numbers are connected to theta functions, in particular the Ramanujan theta function.

Applications

A fully connected network of  computing devices requires the presence of  cables or other connections; this is equivalent to the handshake problem mentioned above.

In a tournament format that uses a round-robin group stage, the number of matches that need to be played between  teams is equal to the triangular number . For example, a group stage with 4 teams requires 6 matches, and a group stage with 8 teams requires 28 matches. This is also equivalent to the handshake problem and fully connected network problems.

One way of calculating the depreciation of an asset is the sum-of-years' digits method, which involves finding , where  is the length in years of the asset's useful life. Each year, the item loses , where  is the item's beginning value (in units of currency),  is its final salvage value,  is the total number of years the item is usable, and  the current year in the depreciation schedule.

Board game designers Geoffrey Engelstein and Isaac Shalev describe triangular numbers as having achieved "nearly the status of a mantra or koan among game designers", describing them as "deeply intuitive" and "featured in an enormous number of games, [proving] incredibly versatile at providing escalating rewards for larger sets without overly incentivizing specialization to the exclusion of all other strategies".

Triangular roots and tests for triangular numbers

which follows immediately from the quadratic formula. So an integer  is triangular if and only if  is a square.

Alternative name
An alternative name proposed by Donald Knuth, by analogy to factorials, is "termial", with the notation ? for the th triangular number. However, although some other sources use this name and notation, they are not in wide use.

See also
 1 + 2 + 3 + 4 + ⋯
 Doubly triangular number, a triangular number whose position in the sequence of triangular numbers is also a triangular number
 Tetractys, an arrangement of ten points in a triangle, important in Pythagoreanism

References

External links

 
 Triangular numbers at cut-the-knot
 There exist triangular numbers that are also square at cut-the-knot
 
 Hypertetrahedral Polytopic Roots by Rob Hubbard, including the generalisation to triangular cube roots, some higher dimensions, and some approximate formulas

Figurate numbers
Factorial and binomial topics
Integer sequences
Proof without words
Squares in number theory
Triangles
Simplex numbers